The dugite (Pseudonaja affinis) is a species of venomous, potentially lethal, snake native to Western Australia, a member of the family Elapidae.

The word dugite is an anglicisation of names for the snake in some dialects of the Nyungar language, including dukayj and dukitj.  However, another, probably cognate name, dobitj, has become the common name for dugites in Nyungar. (This can cause confusion, because dobitj is also used in some dialects to refer to other kinds of venomous snakes.)

Description
The dugite is a venomous snake, considered dangerous. It is coloured grey, green, or brown. The colours vary widely between individuals and are an unreliable means of identifying the species. Black scales can be scattered over the body; their scales are relatively large with a semi-glossy appearance. The most distinguishing characteristic is the head that can be rather small and indistinct from the neck.

Distribution and habitat

P. affinis is found in southern parts of Western Australia and in remote coastal parts of western South Australia.

The dugite occupies a wide variety of habitats ranging from coastal dunes and heathlands to shrub lands and woodlands. It also appears to thrive in heavily degraded habitats such as golf courses, industrial areas, and open agricultural farmlands.

The dugite has increased in population since the opening up of its natural habitats and introduction of the house mouse due to the mouse being a main food source for it. In the Perth metropolitan area, the dugite is one of the most common snakes found next to buildings. In areas of human population, the snake will take temporary shelter under concrete slabs, fibro sheeting, roofing tin, and such, although in more natural habitats, it will shelter under rocks and in abandoned termite mounds. It also burrows during the winter.

Behaviour
In the wild, dugites may be sheltering beneath logs or rocks. When disturbed, they are very shy and often slither away, but they will defend themselves if cornered. The species is diurnal. On hot days, activity occurs mainly in the morning, and to lesser extent in the afternoon.

Diet 
P. affinis, like most snakes, are carnivores, eating lizards, others snakes, mice and rats.

Reproduction
As with all brown snakes, mating normally occurs between early September and late November. The dugite is an egg-laying (oviparous) snake, and typically deposits around 30 eggs and abandons them to self-incubate.  The eggs hatch after about 65 days.  Under optimal environmental conditions, the dugite has been known to lay two clutches during the same season.

Envenomation
The venom of P. affinis is potentially one of the most lethal in the world, causing coagulopathic and procoagulant effects. Dugites generally avoid biting humans, but risks of encounters increase when they are most active during the mating season through October and November.

The last death attributed to a dugite was in Fremantle (South Beach) on 15 August 2015. A woman was bitten on her heel mid-afternoon while walking alone. She walked home and later collapsed whilst her husband was taking her to her car  to transport her to the hospital. The ambulance was called, arriving 5 minutes later, but medics were unable to revive her. 

In January 2011, a seven-year-old Perth boy was bitten and temporarily paralyzed after a dugite entered his bedroom and wrapped itself around his arm while he slept. After receiving immediate medical attention, he made a full recovery.

In December 2020, a three-year-old girl was bitten by a snake, believed to be a dugite, while playing in a courtyard at her grandmother's unit complex in Mandurah. Her grandmother quickly immobilised her and wrapped her legs in pressure bandages. The girl was treated with anti-venom in hospital and made a full recovery.

Taxonomy
The species was first described by Albert Günther in 1872. It is a member of the genus Pseudonaja, sometimes referred to as brown snakes, contained in the family Elapidae. The descriptions of three subspecies are currently accepted; they are:
Pseudonaja affinis affinis Günther, 1872 — coastal mainland Western Australia
Pseudonaja affinis exilis Storr, 1989 — mainland Western Australia and Rottnest Island
Pseudonaja affinis tanneri (Worrell, 1961) — mainland Western Australia, Boxer Island and other islands

Note: A trinomial authority in parentheses indicates that the subspecies was originally described in a genus other than Pseudonaja.

Conservation status
Dugites are protected under the Wildlife Conservation Act 1950, and to kill or injure one attracts a fine up to A$4000.

In literature 
Convicted Irish Fenian and civil rights activist, John Boyle O'Reilly, celebrated a bushman's myth of the "dukite" in his popular poem "The Dukite Snake", which can be found in his 1878 collection Songs, Legends and Ballads:
…
Now I'll change to a devil—ay, to a devil!
You needn't start; if a spirit of evil
Ever came to this world its hate to slake
On mankind, it came as a Dukite Snake.

Like? Like the pictures you've seen of Sin,
A long red snake—as if what was within
Was fire that gleamed through his glistening skin.
And his eyes—if you could go down to hell,
And come back to your fellows here and tell
What the fire was like, you could find no thing,
Here below on the earth, or up in the sky,
To compare it to but a Dukite's eye!

Now, mark you, these Dukites don't go alone:
There's another near when you see but one;
And beware you of killing that one that you see
Without finding the other; for you may be
More than twenty miles from the spot that night;
When camped, but you're tracked by the lone Dukite;
That will follow your trail like Death or Fate
And kill you as sure as you killed its mate.
…

The book ran to at least seven editions, and the poem has been discussed and anthologized since.

In Chapter 16 of M. L Stedman's The Light Between Oceans, Septimus Pott's wife, Hannah Roennfeldt's mother, Ellen, a debutante from Perth, Australia died within an hour after being bitten above the ankle  by a dugite.

See also
The Dugites - 1970s Perth band

References

Further reading
Judge, R. K., Henry, P. J., d'Aprile, A. C., Lynch, D., Jelinek, G. A., Wilce, M. C. J., & Wilce, J. A. (2002). Identification of PLA(2) and alpha-neurotoxin proteins in the venom of pseudonaja affinis (dugite). Toxicology and Applied Pharmacology, 181(3), 184.

Herrmann, R. P., Davey, M. G., & Skidmore, P. H. (1972). The coagulation defect after envenomation by the bite of the dugite (demansia nuchalis affinis), a western Australian brown snake. The Medical Journal of Australia, 2(4), 183.

Wagovau. (2016). Wagovau. Retrieved 13 May 2016, from https://web.archive.org/web/20160314050635/http://perthzoo.wa.gov.au/wp-content/uploads/2011/06/Dugite-Fact-Sheet.pdf

Australianmuseumnetau. (2016). Australianmuseumnetau. Retrieved 13 May 2016, from http://australianmuseum.net.au/dugite

Pilbarapythonscom. (2016). Pilbarapythonscom. Retrieved 13 May 2016, from http://www.pilbarapythons.com/dugite.htm

Animalarkcomau. (2016). Animalarkcomau. Retrieved 13 May 2016, from http://www.animalark.com.au/pdfs/SnakeAware.pdf

Bush, Brian et al. 2007. Reptiles and Frogs in the Bush: Southwestern Australia. Crawley, Western Australia: University of Western Australia Press. 302 pp. .
Storr GM. 1979. (Reprinted 1988). Dangerous Snakes of Western Australia. Perth, W.A.: Western Australian Museum.  24 pp. .
Storr GM. 1989. A new Pseudonaja (Serpentes: Elapidae) from Western Australia. Records of the Western Australian Museum 14 (3): 421-423. (Pseudonaja affinis exilis, new subspecies).
Storr GM. 2002. Snakes of Western Australia: Revised Edition Perth, W.A.: Western Australian Museum. 309 pp. .
Swan, Gerry. 1995. A Photographic Guide to Snakes and Other Reptiles of Australia Frenchs Forest, New South Wales: New Holland Publishers. 144 pp. .

External links

  Includes poison - Venom information
  Australian Snakes

Pseudonaja
Reptiles of Western Australia
Reptiles described in 1872
Taxa named by Albert Günther
Venomous snakes
Snakes of Australia